William Milton Moore (May 19, 1926 – December 22, 2013) was an American football coach, basketball coach, and college athletics administrator.  He served as the head football coach at Shepherd College from 1951 to 1952 and at Central Connecticut State University from 1959 to 1961, compiling a career college football record of 17–23–2.  Moore was also the head basketball coach at Shepherd from 1951 to 1953 and at Central Connecticut State from 1953 to 1959, tallying a career college basketball mark of 92–70.  He was inducted into the National Association of Collegiate Directors of Athletics Hall of Fame in 2008.

Moore graduated from Bradley Central High School in Cleveland, Tennessee in 1944.  He earned a Bachelor of Science in health and physical education from Tennessee Technological University in 1944, a Master of Science in physical education from the University of Tennessee in 1949, and a Ph.D. in physical education from the University of Michigan in 1954.  Moore died on December 22, 2013 at the age of 87.

Head coaching record

Football

References

1926 births
2013 deaths
Albany Great Danes athletic directors
Basketball coaches from Tennessee
Central Connecticut Blue Devils athletic directors
Central Connecticut Blue Devils football coaches
Central Connecticut Blue Devils men's basketball coaches
Little East Conference commissioners
New England Collegiate Conference commissioners
People from Cleveland, Tennessee
Shepherd Rams athletic directors
Shepherd Rams football coaches
University of Michigan School of Education alumni
University of Tennessee alumni
Tennessee Technological University alumni